Andrew Martin Higgins (12 February 1960 – July 2021) was an English footballer who played as a defender. He played 71 league games in the Football League, mostly for teams struggling near the bottom of the Fourth Division.

Career
Higgins turned professional with Chesterfield in February 1978. He played one Third Division game for the "Spireites" in 1978–79, under Arthur Cox. He signed with Port Vale in February 1981, with manager John McGrath looking to add some strength to a poor defence. Higgins played ten games in 1980–81, helping the "Valiants" to rise off the foot of the Football League. However, he failed to nail down a regular place and played just four Fourth Division games in 1981–82. He was given a free transfer away from Vale Park in May 1982, and moved on to Billy Horner's Hartlepool United. He played four league games in 1982–83, scoring one goal for a team struggling near the foot of the Fourth Division. He later played for King's Lynn, before joining his former teammate Jimmy Greenhoff at Rochdale, who were forced to apply for re-election to the Football League in 1983–84. He then played 19 league games for Chester City in 1984–85, before leaving for South Africa. He had been signed by John McGrath at Chester, before Mick Speight took over at Sealand Road.

Career statistics

References

1960 births
2021 deaths
People from Bolsover
Footballers from Derbyshire
English footballers
Association football defenders
Chesterfield F.C. players
Port Vale F.C. players
Hartlepool United F.C. players
King's Lynn F.C. players
Rochdale A.F.C. players
Chester City F.C. players
English Football League players